Lavoo Mamledar is an Indian politician and an ex member of the Goa Legislative Assembly from the Ponda constituency in South Goa.

He was elected in the 2012 Goa Legislative Assembly election on a ticket from Maharashtrawadi Gomantak Party. he lost the 2017 Goa Legislative Assembly election to Ravi Naik of Congress party. He was a member of the All India Trinamool Congress for three months until December 2021. In January 2022, he joined Congress.

References 

Members of the Goa Legislative Assembly
Living people
21st-century Indian politicians
Maharashtrawadi Gomantak Party politicians
Year of birth missing (living people)
Former members of Trinamool Congress
Indian National Congress politicians from Goa